The Nipmuck Trail is a Blue-Blazed hiking trail "system" which meanders through  of forests in northeast Connecticut. It is maintained by the Connecticut Forest and Park Association and is considered one of the Blue-Blazed hiking trails. There are two southern trail heads (two tines of a fork) in the south of the town of Mansfield, Connecticut. The southwestern terminus is at a road shoulder parking place on Puddin Lane, and the southeastern terminus is a DEEP parking lot on North Windham Road at the southeast corner of Mansfield Hollow State Park. The northern terminus is at the north end of Breakneck Pond along the Massachusetts border in Nipmuck State Forest.  Camping permits may be obtained for up to five separate locations for backpacking.

For  the Nipmuck Trail travels through the Yale-Myers Forest which is owned by Yale University.  The trail also traverses  of the University of Connecticut's East Campus (the protected Moss tract through the Fenton Forest). For about 6 miles, the trail follows the Fenton River from the University of Connecticut to Mansfield Hollow State Park.

Trail description
The Nipmuck Trail is primarily used for hiking, backpacking, picnicking, and in the winter, snowshoeing.

Portions of the trail are suitable for, and are used for, cross-country skiing and geocaching. Site-specific activities enjoyed along the route include bird watching, hunting (very limited), fishing, horseback riding,  bouldering and rock climbing (limited).

The mainline trail is blazed with blue rectangles. Trail descriptions are available from a number of commercial and non-commercial sources, and a complete guidebook is published by the Connecticut Forest and Park Association

Historic sites
There is a historic gristmill near the trail in Storrs, Connecticut. Across from this is the house where Wilbur Cross was born.  A segment of the trail in Ashford follows the Old Connecticut Path, a former Native American trail connecting the Boston area with the Connecticut River Valley.

History

The Blue-Blazed Nipmuck Trail was created by the Connecticut Forest and Park Association.

Maintenance 
The last week of March 2010 the Connecticut Forest and Park Association acquired the largest conservation easement in an agreement with the University of Connecticut for the  section of the Nipmuck Trail which passes through University of Connecticut protected property (the Moss tract through the Fenton Forest).

Gallery

See also
 Blue-Blazed Trails
 Nipmuc
 Yale-Myers Forest
 Codfish Falls
 Fifty Foot Cliff

References

 Connecticut Forest & Park Association Cited September 13, 2008.

Further reading

External links
Specific to this trail:
 Connecticut Explorers Guide: Nipmuck Trail Overview Map
 Connecticut Explorers Guide: Nipmuck Trail Southern Trailheads Map
 Connecticut Explorers Guide: Nipmuck Trail Southern Trails Junction to RT 74 Map

Government Links:
  Town of Mansfield - Trail Guides
 Town of Mansfield - Schoolhouse Brook Park

Land and Conservation Trusts:
 Joshua's Tract Conservation and Historic Trust, Inc.
 Joshua's Tract/Tract Trails Walk Book
 Joshua's Tract/Trust Trail Maps

 

Hiking trails in Connecticut
Protected areas of Tolland County, Connecticut
Mansfield, Connecticut
Blue-Blazed Trails